Mission: Impossible – Fallout is a 2018 American action spy film written and directed by Christopher McQuarrie. It is the sequel to Mission: Impossible – Rogue Nation (2015) and is the sixth installment in the Mission: Impossible film series. The film stars Tom Cruise in the main role, Ving Rhames, Simon Pegg, Rebecca Ferguson, Henry Cavill, Angela Bassett, Sean Harris, Michelle Monaghan, and Alec Baldwin. In Mission: Impossible – Fallout, Ethan Hunt (Cruise) and his Impossible Missions Force (IMF) team seek to prevent nuclear weapon technology from reaching the Apostles, a bioterrorist offshoot of the Syndicate.

Talks for a sixth Mission: Impossible film began before the release of its predecessor in 2015. Mission: Impossible – Fallout was officially announced in November 2015, with McQuarrie confirmed to write and direct, thus becoming the first director to return to the franchise. The returns of the cast were announced soon after; Jeremy Renner, who appeared in the previous two films, confirmed his absence at CinemaCon in March 2017, due to scheduling conflicts with Avengers: Endgame (2019). Principal photography began in April 2017 and lasted until March 2018, with filming locations including Paris, New Zealand, London, Norway, and the United Arab Emirates. Production was notably put on hold for seven weeks following an injury to Cruise in August 2017.

Mission: Impossible – Fallout premiered in Paris on July 12, 2018, and was theatrically released in the United States in RealD 3D and IMAX (a first for the series) by Paramount Pictures on July 27. It received critical acclaim, with praise for its action sequences, McQuarrie's direction and screenplay, and the cast performances (particularly Cruise and Cavill's); it is widely considered to be the best installment in the franchise, as well as one of the best action films of the 2010s. The film grossed $791 million worldwide, making it the highest-grossing film in the franchise, the eighth-highest-grossing film of 2018, and the then-highest-grossing film of Cruise's career (until 2022's Top Gun: Maverick). A sequel, Mission: Impossible – Dead Reckoning Part One, is scheduled for release in July 2023.

Plot 

Two years after Solomon Lane's capture, the remnants of the Syndicate have reorganized as a terrorist group known as the Apostles, having adopted the 'Terror for hire' policy. They are hired by an extremist known as John Lark, and are attempting to acquire three stolen plutonium cores for him to use in three nuclear bombs. IMF Agent Ethan Hunt is assigned to recover the plutonium. During the mission, the Apostles take fellow teammate Luther Stickell hostage. Ethan chooses to save Stickell, allowing the Apostles to steal the cores. The IMF team later captures Norwegian nuclear weapons expert Nils Delbruuk, whom the CIA believes is building weapons for Lark. Using a fake broadcast of teammate Benji Dunn posing as CNN's Wolf Blitzer and announcing the bombings of Rome, Jerusalem and Mecca, they trick Delbruuk into unlocking a phone he used to communicate with Lark.

Furious at the IMF's failure to secure the plutonium, CIA Director Erika Sloane instructs Special Activities Division Agent August Walker to accompany Ethan on a mission to retrieve it. Ethan and Walker infiltrate a Paris nightclub where Lark is supposed to purchase the plutonium from the Apostles, with arms dealer Alanna Mitsopolis acting as a broker. They track a man they suspect to be Lark, but after an intense fight in the men's restroom, he is killed by MI6 Agent Ilsa Faust. Ethan assumes the identity of Lark and meets with Mitsopolis, but the meeting is cut short when hitmen attack. In exchange for the plutonium, Mitsopolis tasks Ethan with extracting Lane from an armored convoy moving through Paris, and provides one of the cores as a down payment. 

Ethan and Walker preemptively attack the convoy to prevent Mitsopolis’ brother Zola and their men from killing local police. They lead both the police and Mitsopolis's men on a chase while Dunn and Stickell secure Lane. Mitsopolis then instructs Ethan to deliver Lane to London. At a London safe house, IMF Secretary Hunley orders Ethan to stop the mission and turn himself in after receiving doctored evidence implicating Ethan as Lark. The team trick Walker into admitting he is the real Lark and inform Sloane, who sends a CIA unit to take everyone into custody. However, the unit has been infiltrated by the Apostles and is under Walker's command. 

Walker kills Hunley and Ethan pursues him to Tate Modern, where Walker threatens his ex-wife, Julia, before escaping by helicopter. The team, along with Faust, track Lane and Walker to a medical camp over the Siachen Glacier. Faust deduces that Lane is planning to detonate the nuclear bombs at the medical camp, contaminating the water supply of India, Pakistan, and China, resulting in the destruction of 1/3 of the world's population. The bombs are linked by a failsafe; any attempt to defuse one bomb without also disarming the detonator will trigger the others. Ethan discovers Julia and her new husband Erik are working at the camp. Lane programs the bombs' detonator with a 15-minute countdown and gives it to Walker. 

Walker takes off in a helicopter while Dunn, Stickell, and Faust try to find and defuse the nuclear weapons. Julia helps Stickell disarm the first bomb, but they are unable to defuse it without the detonator. Faust finds the second bomb but is ambushed and subdued by Lane; Dunn and Faust eventually overpower him. Ethan hijacks an escort helicopter and manages to ram Walker's out of the sky. The two men fight on the edge of a cliff, which ends when Ethan drops a hook attached to a helicopter on Walker. Ethan secures the detonator, allowing the team to deactivate the bombs. In the aftermath, Julia tells Ethan that he has given her the best life, despite his commitment to the IMF. Sloane hands Lane over to MI6 through Mitsopolis, earning Faust her exoneration, and praises Ethan for his actions.

Cast 
 Tom Cruise as Ethan Hunt, an agent of the Impossible Missions Force (IMF)
 Henry Cavill as August Walker / John Lark, an assassin working for Sloane in the Special Activities Division of the CIA sent to monitor Ethan and his team.
 Ving Rhames as Luther Stickell, an IMF agent, a long running member of Hunt's team and a computer hacker
 Simon Pegg as Benji Dunn, an IMF technical field agent and a member of Hunt's team
 Rebecca Ferguson as Ilsa Faust, a former MI6 agent who allied with Hunt at Paris, London, and the Siachen Glacier
 Sean Harris as Solomon Lane, an anarchist mastermind who was the leader of the Syndicate, later known as the Apostles
 Angela Bassett as Erika Sloane, the new Director of the CIA replacing Hunley, and Walker's superior
 Vanessa Kirby as Alanna Mitsopolis / White Widow, an arms dealer and the daughter of Max, whom Hunt arrested during the events of  the first film
 Michelle Monaghan as Julia Meade, a doctor and Ethan's ex-wife
 Alec Baldwin as Alan Hunley, the former Director of the CIA who later became the new IMF Secretary
 Wes Bentley as Erik, Julia's husband
 Frederick Schmidt as Zola Mitsopolis, Alanna's brother and right hand 
 Ross O'Hennessy as a British agent
 Liang Yang as the John Lark decoy
 Kristoffer Joner as Nils Delbruuk, a Norwegian rogue nuclear weapons specialist
 Alix Bénézech as the French policewoman whom Ethan saves from Alanna’s and Zola's men in Paris
 Caspar Phillipson as a plutonium dealer
 Wolf Blitzer as himself, a disguise worn by Dunn

Production

Pre-production 
On May 23, 2015, The Tracking Board reported that Paramount Pictures was developing a sixth Mission: Impossible film, with Tom Cruise, J. J. Abrams, David Ellison, and Dana Goldberg returning to produce, along with Don Granger and Matt Grimm as executive producers, and Elizabeth Raposo overseeing development. On July 28, 2015, Cruise confirmed on The Daily Show that a sixth film was already being developed, and told its host Jon Stewart that the filming would "probably" commence in summer 2016. On August 2, 2015, Paramount executive Rob Moore told Variety that the sequel was already in the works, stating that they were "very happy to be developing this movie with Tom," and "there has to be another movie." On November 19, 2015, it was announced that Paramount had again hired Christopher McQuarrie to write the film, while it was possible that he would also direct again. The studio was moving fast, with plans to begin shooting in August 2016. On November 30, 2015, McQuarrie confirmed through his Twitter account that he would be back for directing duty as well, and also produce the film along with Cruise. 
On August 19, 2016, The Hollywood Reporter wrote that Paramount had halted pre-production on the film for a dispute over salary between Cruise and the studio, as Cruise wanted to be paid equal to or more than his fee for the Universal Pictures film The Mummy. On September 16, The Hollywood Reporter confirmed that Cruise's dispute with the studio had been resolved. Production would now begin in spring 2017. In November, Jeremy Renner—who portrayed William Brandt in the fourth and fifth films—stated that he was unsure if he would be part of the sixth film because of scheduling conflicts with his role as Hawkeye in Marvel Studios' Avengers: Endgame (2019). In March 2017, it was confirmed at CinemaCon that he would not return for the sixth film.

In February, McQuarrie revealed that the film would include more backstory to Ethan Hunt's personal life. On June 13, 2017, Michelle Monaghan was announced to return as Ethan Hunt's wife Julia Meade-Hunt.

Filming 
Filming was slated to start in Paris on April 10, 2017. Other locations included London, New Zealand and Norway. Filming officially began on April 8. Some of the filming also took place in New Zealand in July 2017. The municipality of Forsand in Norway allowed the closing of Preikestolen ('Pulpit Rock') for a time in autumn for the film's shoot; only crew members and cast were allowed to approach the mountain for nine consecutive days. They also were allowed up to 50 helicopter landings per day. The scenes set in the Indian-administered territory of Jammu and Kashmir were shot in New Zealand. Director Christopher McQuarrie said that he wanted the climax of the film to be set in a more "politically complex" location than New Zealand, so he chose to set this sequence in Kashmir.

In August 2017, Cruise injured his right leg on the London set during filming. Following the accident, the studio announced it would halt production for at least nine weeks for Cruise's broken ankle and other injuries to heal, but released a statement saying that they would be keeping the July 2018 release date for the film. The injury resulted in a cost of around $80 million for the studio because they had to pay the cast and crew for the eight-week hiatus so they would not take another job. However, the injury and subsequent costs were offset by insurance. They did not count against the film's final budget. Filming resumed in early October 2017, with Cruise spotted on the set seven weeks after his initial injury and two weeks earlier than initially planned.

Reshoots for Cavill's Justice League coincided with the schedule for Fallout, for which he had grown a mustache which he was contracted to keep while filming. While McQuarrie initially gave the producers of Justice League permission to have Cavill shave the mustache in exchange for the $3 million it would cost to shut down production on Fallout and then digitally fill the mustache in, executives from Paramount rejected the idea, forcing Justice Leagues VFX team to use special effects to digitally remove the mustache in post-production.

On January 25, 2018, the title was revealed to be Mission: Impossible – Fallout. Filming wrapped in the United Arab Emirates (UAE) on March 25, 2018. Production in the UAE included filming of a High Altitude Low Opening (HALO) jump scene with Cruise. As the scene was to be set near sunset, they could only make one jump a day to try to get each shot. One of the biggest challenges for the visual effects team was replacing the Abu Dhabi desert with Paris, which is where the jump takes place in the film. Artists re-created the Grand Palais des Champs-Élysées using reference imagery, Lidar scans, and photogrammetry from drone footage that was taken above the building.

Visual effects
The visual effects were provided by DNEG and Blind LTD and supervised by Huw Evans, Andrew Booth, and Jody Johnson with the help of One of Us and The Third Floor.

Music

The musical score for Mission: Impossible – Fallout was composed by Lorne Balfe. McQuarrie confirmed Balfe to be the composer for the film in April 2018, replacing the previous composer and longtime collaborator Joe Kraemer. Balfe was given eight months to score the film and had a very collaborative process. The score has been praised by many critics, calling it an epic and inspiring score, with some powerful themes which are balanced with softer, more sentimental ones; some also considered it being too "Nolan-esque," comparing it to scores by Hans Zimmer (particularly The Dark Knight Rises). The score implements the use of percussion, snares, and bongos to create a jaunty staccato momentum.

The digital album was released through Paramount Music on July 14, 2018. The physical soundtrack was released later in the month by La-La Land Records.

Marketing
The first trailer was released on February 4, 2018, during Super Bowl LII, and a second one on May 16, 2018. Marketing spent a total of $140 million on global promotion and advertisements.

Release

Theatrical
Mission: Impossible – Fallout was released in the United States and Canada on July 27, 2018, by Paramount in RealD 3D, IMAX, and IMAX 3D, and August 31, 2018, in China. The film premiered in Paris on July 12, 2018.
The film was released in India with some edits to exclude any mention of the Indian state of Jammu and Kashmir. It was the last film in the franchise to be produced by Bad Robot Productions, which ended its partnership with Paramount in 2018.

Home media 
Mission: Impossible – Fallout was released for digital download on November 20, 2018, and was released on DVD, Blu-ray, and Ultra HD Blu-ray on December 4, 2018. The digital and Blu-ray releases include behind-the-scenes featurettes, a deleted scenes montage, an isolated score, and three commentary tracks. The film is also available in 3D on certain VOD services around the world.

Reception

Box office
Mission: Impossible – Fallout grossed $220.2 million in the United States and Canada, and $571 million in other territories, for a total worldwide gross of $791.1 million, against a production budget of $178 million, becoming the highest-grossing  Mission: Impossible film.

In the United States and Canada, Fallout was released alongside Teen Titans Go! To the Movies, and was projected to gross $48–65 million in its opening weekend, with some estimates going as high as $75 million. It opened in 4,386 theaters, the most ever for the franchise and the seventh-widest release of all time. The film made $6 million from Thursday night previews (including $1 million from IMAX screenings), the highest of the series, a record for Cruise, and a 50% increase from Rogue Nations $4 million. It went on to debut to $61.2 million, the best of the series and the second-highest of Cruise's career. It made $35.3 million in its second weekend to remain in first and marked the best sophomore frame of the franchise. The film made $19.4 million in its third weekend, finishing second behind newcomer The Meg.

In other territories, the film was projected to debut to $75–80 million from 36 countries, for an estimated total global opening of around $135 million. It made $15 million on its first day, including $2.8 million in South Korea. The film ended up overperforming, debuting at $92 million overseas for a worldwide total of $153.5 million. Its largest markets were China ($181 million), South Korea ($24.9 million), the United Kingdom ($9.5 million), and India ($8.2 million). By its third weekend of release, the most significant markets outside the US were: South Korea ($46.4 million), the UK ($22.4 million), India ($13.5 million), Taiwan ($11.9 million), Mexico ($10.8 million), Brazil ($9.6 million) and UAE ($6.4 million).

Critical response 
The website's critical consensus reads, "Fast, sleek, and fun, Mission: Impossible – Fallout lives up to the 'impossible' part of its name by setting yet another high mark for insane set pieces in a franchise full of them." On Metacritic, the film has a weighted average score of 86 out of 100, based on 60 critics, indicating "universal acclaim." Audiences polled by PostTrak gave the film an 84% overall positive score and a 65% "definite recommend," while CinemaScore reported filmgoers gave it an average grade of "A" on an A+ to F scale, the highest ever for the series.

 Variety's Peter Debruge called the film "the series' most exciting installment yet," saying, "McQuarrie clearly believes in creating coherent set pieces: His combat scenes are tense, muscular, and clean, shot and edited in such a way that the spatial geography makes sense." David Ehrlich of IndieWire gave the film a grade of "A" and called it one of the best action films ever, writing "He's only Tom Cruise because nobody else is willing to be—or maybe he's only Tom Cruise so that nobody else has to be. Either way, Fallout is the film he's always promised us, and it is worth the wait." Entertainment Weekly Chris Nashawaty also gave the film an "A" grade, commenting on Cruise that "He's still Hollywood's hungriest movie star", with the series getting "better, twistier and more deliriously fun with each installment". George Simpson of The Express complimented "the action is brutal and gut-punching, the pacing heart-pumping and the stakes so high it's gasp-inducing at times," adding, "Fallout is an improvement on all the previous films' failings, drawing together all the best aspects of them; simultaneously giving off that classic vibe of the original while never being afraid to continually evolve;" he gave the film five out of five stars. The Telegraph's Tim Robey summed up the film as "spectacular and eye-popping," deeming it "the blockbuster of the summer" with "a pleasingly sinuous plot," and calling the film and its series a "Bond-like franchise"; he also rated the film five out of five stars.

Robert Abele of TheWrap described Cruise as an "evergreen movie star with the daredevil heart of a stuntman" and that he "puts every ounce of effort he can into the long, hard work of maintaining a blockbuster franchise." The Hollywood Reporter Todd McCarthy praised director Christopher McQuarrie, saying that with Mission: Impossible – Fallout he "tops what he did with Cruise three years ago," and also singled out Vanessa Kirby for playing her character with "a mix of elegance and frisky abandon." J.R. Kinnard of PopMatters wrote, "Though it lacks the gritty humanity of something like George Miller's Mad Max: Fury Road (2015), Mission: Impossible – Fallout is no less impressive in its dedication to character-driven action and practical special effects. It's a dazzling, non-stop thriller that's sure to become an instant action classic." Screen Daily Tim Grierson wrote, "Tom Cruise is on fighting form in this thrilling franchise topper... [he is] ageless, riveting and seemingly unstoppable," further adding that "the sixth film in the series is among the most outstanding, delivering a near-exhausting amount of stupendous action sequences paired with deft character drama and the requisite life-or-death stakes." Peter Bradshaw of The Guardian gave the film three out of five stars, saying "there isn't as much [humor] in the dialogue as before," but added, "Crashes and petrolhead spills are what this franchise is reasonably expected to deliver. And this is what it cheerfully does."

Sight & Sound Nick Pinkerton wrote, "A strong contender for the most consistently cinematic franchise of the last 25 years, the Mission: Impossible films also offer a case study in the idea of the actor as auteur, with Tom Cruise continuing to present himself as a fearless screen immortal in Fallout."

The film was listed in 53 critics' Top 10 movies of 2018.

Accolades

Sequels 

A sequel, Mission: Impossible – Dead Reckoning Part One, is scheduled to be released on July 14, 2023, after being delayed three times by the COVID-19 pandemic. Announced in January 2019, it will be filmed back-to-back with Dead Reckoning Part Two. It was also announced that both films will be a send-off to Ethan Hunt.

References

External links 
 

2018 films
2018 action films
2010s spy action films
Mission: Impossible (film series)
American spy action films
American action thriller films
American sequel films
2010s English-language films
Films based on television series
Films about the Central Intelligence Agency
Films about nuclear war and weapons
American films about revenge
Films about terrorism in Europe
Films set in Belfast
Films set in 2018
Films set in Berlin
Films set in India
Films set in London
Films set in Paris
Films shot in London
Films shot in Norway
Films shot in Paris
Bad Robot Productions films
Skydance Media films
Paramount Pictures films
Films directed by Christopher McQuarrie
Films produced by J. J. Abrams
Films produced by Tom Cruise
Films with screenplays by Christopher McQuarrie
Films scored by Lorne Balfe
IMAX films
Films about the Secret Intelligence Service
Indian Army in films
Films shot in New Zealand
2010s American films